Parallactis zorophanes is a moth in the family Autostichidae. It was described by Anthonie Johannes Theodorus Janse in 1954. It is found in South Africa.

References

Endemic moths of South Africa
Parallactis
Moths described in 1954